The men's 4 x 400 metres relay at the 2014 European Athletics Championships took place at the Letzigrund on 16 and 17 August.

Medalists

Records

Schedule

Results

Round 1
First 3 in each heat (Q) and 2 best performers (q) advance to the Final.

Final

References

Round 1 Results
Final Results

Relay 4 x 400 M
4 x 400 metres relay at the European Athletics Championships